On 24 March 1999, a transport truck caught fire while driving through the Mont Blanc Tunnel between France and Italy. When it stopped halfway through the tunnel, it violently combusted. Other vehicles traveling through the tunnel quickly became trapped and they also caught fire as firefighters were unable to reach the transport truck. 39 people were killed. In the aftermath, major changes were made to the tunnel to improve its safety.

Fire

On the morning of 24 March 1999, 39 people died when a Belgian transport truck carrying flour and margarine, which had entered the French-side portal, caught fire in the tunnel. 

The truck came through the tollbooth at 10:46 CET. The initial journey through the tunnel was routine. According to the National Geographic documentary programme Seconds from Disaster, the fire and smoke appeared at around 10:49. Shortly after, the driver realized something was wrong as cars coming in the opposite direction flashed their headlights at him; a glance in his mirrors showed white smoke coming out from under his cabin. This was not yet considered a fire emergency. In fact, there had been 16 other truck fires in the tunnel over the previous 35 years, always extinguished on the spot by the drivers. 

At 10:53, the driver of the vehicle, Gilbert Degrave, stopped 6 km into the 11.6 km tunnel, in attempt to fight the fire but he was suddenly forced back when the payload violently combusted. Degrave subsequently abandoned his vehicle and ran to the Italian entrance of the tunnel.

At 10:54, one of the drivers called from refuge 22 to raise the alarm. At 10:55, the tunnel employees triggered the fire alarm and stopped any further traffic from entering. At this point, there were at least 10 cars and 18 trucks in the tunnel that had entered from the French side. A few vehicles from the Italian side passed the Volvo truck without stopping. Some of the cars from the French side managed to turn around in the narrow two-lane tunnel to retreat back to France, but navigating the road in the dense smoke that had rapidly filled the tunnel quickly made this impossible. 

Between 10:53 and 10:57, the smoke had already covered half a kilometer of the French side. The larger trucks were stranded, as they did not have the space to turn around, and reversing out was not an option.

Most drivers rolled up their windows and waited for rescue. The ventilation system in the tunnel drove toxic smoke back down the tunnel faster than anyone could run to safety. These fumes quickly filled the tunnel and starved off oxygen, disabling vehicles. This included fire engines which, once affected, had to be abandoned by the firefighters. Many drivers near the blaze who attempted to leave their cars and seek refuge points were quickly overcome due to toxic components of the smoke, mainly cyanide.

At 10:57 and 10:59, two fire trucks from Chamonix responded to the unfolding disaster. Melted wiring had eliminated any possible light sources in the tunnel; in the smoke and with abandoned and wrecked vehicles blocking their path, both fire engines were unable to proceed, and were blocked at garage 17, 1200 meters from the burning truck. Without other possibilities, they abandoned their vehicles and took refuge in two of the emergency fire cubicles (fire-door sealed small rooms set into the walls every 600 metres). 

Between 10:57 and 11:01, Italian firefighters had come within 300 metres of the truck, with two of them able to proceed to the garage 21. They were able to see the burning truck. However, burning fuel flowed down the road surface, causing tires and fuel tanks to explode and sending deadly shrapnel in the air, thus spreading fire to other vehicles. This had forced Italian firefighters to retreat, and they rescued 12 people from Italian side. 

At 11:10 six Chamonix firefighters entered the tunnel, but were blocked at the garage 17, 2700 meters from the truck. By 11:11, more Italian firefighters had come to tackle the fire. They were blocked at garage 22 and had also abandoned their vehicles, and searched for trapped groups of firefighters who had taken refuge in the fire cubicles. When it was realized that the cubicles were offering little protection from the smoke, they began searching for the doors that led to the ventilation duct. 

By 11:30, 37 minutes after start of the fire, smoke had reached the French entrance of the tunnel, 6 kilometers from the truck. At 11:39, another team of firefighters entered the tunnel from the French side but were blocked at the garage 5, 4800 meters from the truck.

All of the firefighters were rescued five hours later by a third fire crew that responded and reached them via a ventilation duct; of the 15 firefighters who had been trapped, 14 were in serious condition and one (their commanding officer) later died in the hospital.

The fire spread to other cargo vehicles nearby that also carried combustible loads. The fire trapped around 40 vehicles in dense and poisonous smoke containing carbon monoxide and cyanide. Due to weather conditions at the time, airflow through the tunnel was from the Italian side to the French side. Authorities compounded the chimney effect by pumping in further fresh air from the Italian side, escalating the fire whist trapping toxic fumes inside. Only vehicles past the fire on the French side of the tunnel were trapped, while cars on the Italian side of the fire were mostly unaffected. 

There were 29 deaths trapped inside of vehicles, and nine more died trying to escape on foot. All the deceased were on the French side, and were ultimately reduced to bones and ash by the intense heat. Of the initial 50 people trapped by the fire, 12 survived, all of them from the Italian side. Some victims were able to escape to the fire cubicles. The original fire doors on the cubicles were rated to survive for two hours. Some had been upgraded in the 34 years since tunnel construction to survive for four hours.

It was more than five days before the tunnel cooled sufficiently to start repairs.

Aftermath 

The tunnel underwent major changes in the three years it remained closed after the fire. Renovations include computerized detection equipment, extra security bays, a parallel escape shaft and a fire station in the middle of the tunnel complete with double-cabbed fire trucks. The safety shafts also have clean air flowing through them via vents. Any people in the security bays now have video contact with the control centre, so they can communicate with the people trapped inside and inform them about what is happening in the tunnel more clearly.

A remote site for cargo safety inspection was created on each side: Aosta in Italy and Passy-Le Fayet in France. Here all trucks are inspected well before the tunnel entrance. These remote sites are also used as staging areas, to smooth the peaks of commercial traffic.

The experience gained from the investigation into the fire was one of the principal factors that led to the creation of the French Land Transport Accident Investigation Bureau.

TV documentaries were also made concerning the disaster, all distributed worldwide and focusing on either safety aspects or the circumstances that turned what should have been a serious, but controllable incident into a disaster. The first, Seconds from Disaster – Tunnel Inferno (aired 2004), was a reconstruction of the events leading up to and during the disaster and the conclusions of the investigation that followed. The second, Into the Flames – Fire Underground (aired 2006), revisited the circumstances and showed how new technology in the form of a new type of fire extinguisher could have reduced the scale of the disaster and enabled the fire service to reach and remain in the vicinity to fight the fire.

Pierlucio Tinazzi, an Italian security guard who died attempting to rescue a truck driver, was posthumously awarded Italy's Medaglia d'Oro al Valore Civile.

Manslaughter trial 
In Grenoble, France, 16 people and companies were tried on 31 January 2005 for manslaughter. Defendants in the trial included:
 Gilbert Degrave, the Belgian driver of the truck that caught fire in the tunnel
 Volvo, the truck's manufacturer
 The French and Italian managers of the tunnel
 ATMB and SITMB
 Safety regulators
 The Mayor of Chamonix
 A senior official of the French Ministry of Public Works

The exact cause of the fire is disputed. One account reported it to be a cigarette stub carelessly thrown at the truck, which supposedly entered the engine induction snorkel above the cabin, setting the paper air filter on fire. Others blamed a mechanical or electrical fault, or poor maintenance of the truck's engine. An investigation found no evidence of a design fault with the truck. The closest smoke detector was out of order, and French emergency services did not use the same radio frequency as those inside the tunnel. 

The Italian company responsible for operating the tunnel, SITMB, paid €13.5 million ($17.5 million US) to a fund for the families of the victims. Édouard Balladur, former president of the French company operating the tunnel (from 1968 to 1980), and later Prime Minister of France, underwent a witness examination. He was asked about the security measures that he ordered, or did not order, to be carried out. 

Balladur claimed that the catastrophe could be attributed to the fact the tunnel had been divided into two sections operated by two companies (one in France, the other in Italy), which failed to coordinate the situation. On 27 July 2005, thirteen defendants were found guilty, and received sentences ranging from fines to suspended prison sentences to six months in jail:

 Gérard Roncoli, the head of security at the tunnel, was convicted and sentenced to six months in jail plus an additional two-year suspended sentence, the heaviest sentence levied against any of the defendants. The sentence was upheld on appeal.
 Remy Chardon, former president of the French company operating the tunnel, was convicted and received a two-year suspended jail term; he was also fined approximately US$18,000.
 Gilbert Degrave, the driver of the truck, received a four-month suspended sentence.
 Seven other people, including the tunnel's Italian security chief, received suspended terms and fines. 
 Three companies were fined up to US$180,000 each. 
 The charges against Volvo were dropped.

See also
List of transportation fires

References

Tunnel fires
Fires in France 
Fires in Italy
March 1999 events in Europe
1999 fires in Europe
Road incidents in France
Road incidents in Italy
1999 disasters in France 
1999 disasters in Italy